This is the club's first season in Serbian SuperLiga since being relegated in 2011.

Transfers

Fixtures

League table

Serbian Cup

Squad statistics

References

External links
  

Cukaricki
FK Čukarički